Ruth Doan MacDougall, born near Laconia, New Hampshire, is an American author. She is the daughter of hiking writer Daniel Doan.

Bibliography

Novels
The Lilting House (Bobbs-Merrill)
The Cost of Living ( Putnam; Avon)
One Minus One (Putnam; Avon)
The Cheerleader (Putnam; Bantam; Frigate Books)
Wife and Mother (Putnam; Avon)
Aunt Pleasantine (Harper; Avon)
The Flowers of the Forest (Atheneum; Berkley)
A Lovely Time Was Had By All (Atheneum)
Snowy (St. Martin’s Press; Frigate Books)
A Woman Who Loved Lindbergh (Electronic edition, Frigate Books)
Henrietta Snow (Frigate Books)
The Husband Bench (Frigate Books)

References

External links
Ruth Doan MacDougall Home Page
The Papers of Ruth McDougall at Dartmouth College Library

People from Laconia, New Hampshire
People from Belknap County, New Hampshire
Living people
American women novelists
Year of birth missing (living people)
21st-century American women